is a professional Japanese baseball player. He previously played pitcher for the Chunichi Dragons.

Early career
Satō started playing rubber-ball baseball in elementary school. With his high school, Furukawagakuen, he started his freshman year on the bench and reached the best 8 of the Tohoku Regional high school tournament.

He attended Tohoku Fukushi University and started playing league games in his freshman year. In his senior year in a game against Tohoku Institute of Technology, Satō fanned a remarkable 13 batters. He finished with an 11–2 win–loss record with a 1.29 ERA.

On 22 October 2016, Satō was selected as second pick for the Chunichi Dragons at the 2015 Nippon Professional Baseball draft and on 1 December signed a \10,000,000 per year contract with a \70,000,000 sign-on bonus.

Professional career

2016-2017

Satō finished the  NPB season having started 4 games going 1–0 in decisions with a 3.67 ERA. The following season, Satō was limited to mostly work out of the bullpen claiming 2 wins, 2 holds and a 5.40 ERA.

2018-Present
Satō made his first appearance in April, but was immediately demoted to the farm team after surrendering 3 runs. He would later join the team in June and record 11 consecutive games without an earned run. For the end of the season, thanks to the mishaps of Shinji Tajima and Hiroshi Suzuki, Satō was made the closer and on 24 August registered his first career save. Satō would end the season having pitched in 42 games with a 1–2 record, 5 saves, 10 holds and a 2.08 ERA.

Despite breaking out somewhat in 2018, Satō was unable to repeat his success in 2019 making a career lowest 7 mound appearances despite being with the team from opening day. On the farm, Satō would pitch in 24 games, throwing 39 innings for a respectable 3.00 ERA. In the off-season, on October 21, Satō underwent arthroplastic surgery on his right elbow.

International career
On October 26, 2018, he was selected Japan national baseball team at the 2018 MLB Japan All-Star Series.

Pitching style
Satō throws a four-seam fastball that tops out at 151 km/h. He can also throw a forkball that was taught to him by former Seattle Mariners pitcher, Kazuhiro Sasaki.

References

External links

 Dragons.jp
 NPB.jp

1993 births
Living people
Baseball people from Miyagi Prefecture
Japanese baseball players
Nippon Professional Baseball pitchers
Chunichi Dragons players
People from Ōsaki, Miyagi